Protić (Serbian Cyrillic: Протић) is a Serbian surname. It may refer to:

 Kosta Protić, military officer
 Matija Protić, footballer
 Milan St. Protić, historian, politician and diplomat
 Milorad B. Protić, astronomer
 Miodrag B. Protić, painter
 Nemanja Protić, basketball player
 Radoš Protić, footballer
 Stojan Protić, Yugoslav political figure

Serbian surnames